Strangospora is a genus of lichen-forming fungi. It is the only genus in the family Strangosporaceae, which itself is of uncertain taxonomic placement in the Ascomycota. It contains 10 species.

Taxonomy
The genus was circumscribed in 1860 by German lichenologist Gustav Wilhelm Körber, with Strangospora pinicola assigned as the type species. The family Strangosporaceae was proposed in 2014 by Soili Stenroos, Jolanta Miadlikowska, and François Lutzoni, who used molecular phylogenetics to demonstrate that Strangospora should be removed from the Lecanorales and placed in its own family.

Description
Species in the Strangosporaceae are crustose lichens, but sometimes have poorly developed thalli. They have a chlorococcoid photobiont (i.e., green algae of the genus Chlorococcum). The apothecia are biatorine – i.e. more or less  in form, but light in colour and with a soft consistency – and have a poorly developed . The asci are club-shaped (clavate) and have a gelatinous outer layer. Strangospora species mostly occur in the Northern Hemisphere, and grow on wood, on bark, or over bryophytes.

Species

 Strangospora almquistii 
 Strangospora cyphalea 
 Strangospora deplanata 
 Strangospora microhaema 
 Strangospora moriformis 
 Strangospora pinicola 
 Strangospora selengensis 
 Strangospora senecionis 
 Strangospora torvula 
 Strangospora trabicola 

Strangospora ochrophora  is now known as Piccolia ochrophora, while Strangospora delitescens  is now Biatoridium delitescens.

References

Ascomycota
Ascomycota genera
Taxa described in 1860
Lichen genera
Taxa named by Gustav Wilhelm Körber